The Walid is an Egyptian wheeled armored personnel carrier based on the BTR-40. It was built by the Kader Factory for Developed Industries. It entered production in 1960 and was first deployed by the Egyptian Army during the Six-Day War.

History
In the early 1960s, Egypt began to reproduce and reverse engineer a number of Soviet weapons designs. The Walid marked one of Egypt's first attempts at reproducing or adapting Soviet military hardware using Western technology. It was designed by civilian engineers at a Nasr Automotive facility in Helwan and modeled directly on the BTR-40, an early postwar Soviet wheeled APC. The Walid was essentially a BTR-40 hull mated to the chassis of a 4X4 Magirus utility vehicle manufactured under license by the Kader Factory. The sides of the Walid's hull were also sloped, unlike the flat sides of the BTR-40's hull, for improved ballistic protection. Production of the Walid continued with very little variation to the original design until 1981, when Kader began manufacturing the vehicle chassis with slightly different Mercedes-Benz automotive components.

Egypt deployed the Walid during the Six-Day War. Small numbers were captured and pressed into service by the Israel Defense Forces (IDF) in the wake of that conflict. The Walid was replaced in front-line service with the Egyptian Army by the Kader Fahd during the 1980s. However, it continued to see active service with various paramilitary divisions of the Egyptian Ministry of Interior.

Description
The vehicle consists of a German Magirus or Mercedes-Benz truck chassis with an Egyptian-built armored hull. The body was open-topped but fully enclosed versions were available. The open top versions have a canvas cover. The commander has a weapon mount, and others can be positioned along the edges of the roof along the hull sides and rear. The hull has a door on each side of the cab and one door in the rear of the hull. There are also three firing ports on each side of the hull. The Walid has no NBC or night vision system.

Variants
Command Vehicle - basic APC but with extra radios

Self-propelled wheeled multiple-rocket launcher manned by a crew of two and armed with either six or twelve 80 mm rocket-launcher tubes (depending upon model).

Users
The Walid has been supplied to Burundi, Iraq, Sudan, and Yemen where it was mostly used for internal security and riot control. Egypt primarily used it for reconnaissance. 

Israel captured some and used them for desert patrol/reconnaissance. At least one was seized from Angola by the South African Defence Force during Operation Savannah.

In popular culture
In the 1960s and 1970s, the Walid was used several times in war movies shot in the Egyptian desert, appearing as a fake armored truck of the Afrika Korps with a German Balkenkreuz painted on the side.

Operators

Current operators
  - 6 were ordered in 1981 from Egypt and delivered in 1982.
  - 250 in service with the Ministry of Interior.
  - 104 were ordered between 1981 and 1986.
  - Inherited from North Yemen.

Former operators

  - Aid; undisclosed number saw service during the Angolan Civil War.
  – 20 delivered in 1978.
  - Captured from Egypt.
  – 100 were ordered in 1979 and delivered in 1980.
  - 20 were ordered in 1974 and delivered in 1975.
  Palestine Liberation Organization - Aid.

Specifications

Configuration: 4 x 4
Manufacturer: AOI Kader Factory, Cairo, Egypt
Crew: 2 + 10
Armament: 1 x 7.62 mm PKM MG
Ammunition: 1,000 x 7.62 mm
Length: 6.12 m
Width: 2.57 m
Height: 2.3 m
Ground Clearance: 0.4 m
Weight (Combat): 12,000 kg
Weight (Empty): 9,200 kg
Power-to-weight ratio: 14 hp/t
Engine: 168 hp Deutz AG diesel
Maximum Road Speed: 86 km/h
Maximum Range: 800 km
Fording: 0.8 m
Vertical slope: 0.5 m
Gradient: 60%
Side Slope: 30%
Armour: 8 mm steel

References

Bibliography
Christopher F. Foss, Jane's Tank and Combat Vehicle Recognition Guide, HarperCollins Publishers, London 2002.

External links
 Global Security Article
 CNN article

Wheeled armoured personnel carriers
Wheeled reconnaissance vehicles
Armoured fighting vehicles of Egypt
Rocket launchers
Military vehicles introduced in the 1960s
Armoured personnel carriers of the Cold War